Nagina Lok Sabha constituency is one of the 80 Lok Sabha (parliamentary) constituencies in Uttar Pradesh state in northern India. This constituency came into existence in 2008, as a part of delimitation of parliamentary constituencies based on the recommendations of the Delimitation Commission of India constituted in 2002.

Assembly segments
Presently, Nagina Lok Sabha constituency comprises six Vidhan Sabha (legislative assembly) segments. These are:

Members of Parliament

Election results

General Elections 2019

General Elections 2014

General Elections 2009

See also
 Bijnor district
 List of Constituencies of the Lok Sabha

References

External links
Nagina lok sabha  constituency election 2019 result details
Nagina lok sabha  constituency election 2019 date and schedule

Lok Sabha constituencies in Uttar Pradesh
Politics of Bijnor district